Dorotea Gonzaga (6 December 1449 – 20 April 1467) was a Duchess Consort of Milan. She was the daughter of Ludovico III Gonzaga, Marquess of Mantua and Barbara of Brandenburg. In 1466, Dorotea married Galeazzo Maria Sforza, but she died in 1468. Her husband was remarried to Bona of Savoy.

References

Sources

1449 births
1467 deaths
Nobility of Mantua
Dorotea
Duchesses of Milan
House of Sforza
15th-century Italian women